Ryan Christopher Edwards (born 7 October 1993) is an English professional footballer who plays as a defender for Dundee United

Career

Blackburn Rovers
Born in Liverpool, Edwards started a two-year scholarship with Blackburn Rovers in 2010. He was captain of the Blackburn squad that reached the final of the 2011–12 FA Youth Cup. Following this, in May 2012, Edwards signed his first professional contract on a two-year deal.

Despite being determined to make a breakthrough under the management of Gary Bowyer, Edwards was among sixteen players to be released by the club at the end of the 2013–14 season.

Loan moves
On 2 July 2012, Edwards joined League Two side Rochdale on a six-month loan. He made his Rochdale debut in the first round of the League Cup, in a 4–3 loss against Barnsley. and he also made his league debut, in the opening game of the season, in a goalless draw against Northampton Town. Having made 26 league appearances for Rochdale, Edwards returned to his parent club after the club's management decided not to extend his loan spell.

Following his time at Rochdale, Edwards had been linked to sign on loan for the second half of the season. On 21 February 2013, he joined Fleetwood Town on a one-month loan. He made his debut for the club two days later, in a 2–0 loss against Aldershot Town. After making four appearances for the club, his loan spell with Fleetwood Town was extended until the end of the season. Edward went on to make nine appearances for the club before returning to Blackburn Rovers.

On 24 July 2013, Edwards joined Chesterfield on a one-month loan deal. Upon the move, the club's first-team coach Keith Lynch believed Edwards could be a "good asset". Edwards made a starting debut for the club in the opening game of the season, a 2–0 win over Bury. His performances throughout the pre-season and at the start of the season led to Chesterfield extending Edwards' loan spell for two months. Edwards featured less in the first team, and then on 24 October 2013 he returned to Ewood Park.

On 28 November 2013, Edwards joined Tranmere Rovers on loan until 29 December 2013; however, he made his only appearance for the club in the second round of the FA Cup, in a 5–0 defeat to Peterborough United. After his loan spell at Tranmere Rovers came to an end, manager Ronnie Moore explained his decision not including Edwards, stating: "It is not ideal for a young kid to be  coming into the side with the way we are playing at the moment."

Morecambe
On 21 March 2014, Edwards joined League Two side Morecambe on a one-month youth loan. The next day, he made his debut in a 1–1 draw against Northampton Town. Edwards' seven appearances for the club led, on 24 April 2014, to the extension of his loan stay with the Shrimps until the end of the 2013–14 season. He went on to make nine appearances for the club.

After a successful loan spell at the Globe Arena towards the end of the 2013–14 season, Edwards signed a two-year deal after being released by Blackburn Rovers on 19 May 2014; however, at the start of the season, Edwards fractured his fingers in a friendly match, which kept him out for two months. Throughout August, Edwards started to maintain his fitness after surgery. Edwards' first game after signing for the club on a permanent basis, as well as coming from injury, came in a goalless draw against Cheltenham Town on 6 September 2014. Edwards continued to be in the first team, although he spent six games on the substitutes bench.

Edwards was sent off on 7 March 2015, in a 3–2 win over Luton Town. After making his return against Shrewsbury Town on 17 March 2015, he provided an assist for Kevin Ellison in a 1–1 draw against Accrington Stanley on 3 April 2015. Edwards ended his first full season at Morecambe with 31 appearances after suffering a back injury.

Edwards scored his first career goal in a 2–0 win over Portsmouth on 16 August 2016.

Plymouth Argyle
On 13 June 2017, Plymouth Argyle announced Edwards as their third signing of the summer, from Morecambe.

He was offered a new contract by Plymouth Argyle at the end of the 2018–19 season.

Blackpool
On 14 June 2019, Edwards signed a two-year contract with Blackpool, marking a return to his native North West.

He made his debut for the Seasiders in their opening fixture of the 2019–20 season, a 2–0 victory over Bristol Rovers at Bloomfield Road.

Dundee United
On 3 August 2020, Edwards signed for Scottish club Dundee United.

Personal life
Edwards survived testicular cancer after treatment only three months after being diagnosed with the disease.

Career statistics

References

External links

1993 births
Footballers from Liverpool
Living people
English footballers
Association football defenders
Blackburn Rovers F.C. players
Rochdale A.F.C. players
Fleetwood Town F.C. players
Chesterfield F.C. players
Tranmere Rovers F.C. players
Morecambe F.C. players
Plymouth Argyle F.C. players
Blackpool F.C. players
Dundee United F.C. players
English Football League players
Scottish Professional Football League players